The association football champions of Zimbabwe are the winners of the highest league in Zimbabwean football, which is the Zimbabwe Premier Soccer League (ZPSL). The ZPSL was founded in 1980, after Zimbabwe's internationally recognised independence, as a successor to the Rhodesia National Football League, which started in 1962. Originally governed by the Zimbabwe Football Association – the renamed Rhodesia Football Association, created in 1965 – the ZPSL has run itself since 1993.

The first edition of the Rhodesia National Football League took place in 1962, when Bulawayo Rovers won both the inaugural league championship and Cup of Rhodesia to claim the Double in the first season of nationally organised competition in Rhodesia. Since then, the championship has been largely dominated by teams from the country's capital, Harare (Salisbury until 1982), and second-largest city, Bulawayo: all but three of the 50 championships contested in the country have been won by a team based in one of these two cities.

The record 22 titles won by Dynamos is more than twice as many as the number won by the second-most decorated, Bulawayo's Highlanders, who have won seven. Dynamos and Highlanders share the record for most consecutive championships won, each having won four titles in succession. Harare-based Dynamos are the most successful team in cup competition, with ten cup-final victories to their name, one more than CAPS United. Unlike the league, the cup has been won numerous times by clubs from outside the traditional centres of Harare and Bulawayo; provincial sides such as Hwange, Mhangura and Masvingo United have claimed the cup on multiple occasions. The Double has been achieved 11 times in Zimbabwean football; since Bulawayo Rovers won both the league and cup in 1962, the Double has been repeated by Dynamos (seven times), Zimbabwe Saints, Black Rhinos, Highlanders and CAPS United.

Champions

Key

Rhodesia National Football League (1962–79)

Zimbabwe Premier Soccer League (1980–present)

Total titles won

References and notes
Notes

A  Dynamos Salisbury City and Salisbury United amalgamated to form Dynamos Fc
B  (also sometimes referred to Salisbury Tornados) retitled themselves Chibuku Shumba between the 1967 and 1968 seasons.
C  Black Aces were founded in 1976 as a new incarnation of Chibuku Shumba when that club folded in 1975.
D  Chapungu United won the 1995 Cup of Zimbabwe by walkover after the semi-final match between Highlanders and CAPS United was declared void due to the fielding by Highlanders of an ineligible player. Left with no opposing team in the final round, Chapungu took the cup by default.
E  Motor Action were formed in 2000, taking the place of Blackpool in the Premier Soccer League by buying that team's franchise.
F  The Mbada Diamonds Cup was launched in 2011, with the 16 teams from the Zimbabwe Premier Soccer League participating. The winner will qualify for the CAF Confederation Cup.

References

General references
League records sourced to: 
and: 
Cup records sourced to: 

Football in Zimbabwe
Zimbabwe